novobanco is a Portuguese bank introduced on 4 August 2014 by the Bank of Portugal to rescue assets and liabilities of Banco Espírito Santo (BES). BES was the second largest private financial institution in Portugal in terms of net assets, as well as one of the oldest and most reputed Portuguese banks.

The rescue of Banco Espirito Santo came after weeks of increasingly bad news about the financial state of the lender, particularly its exposure to a cascade of companies headed by its founding Espirito Santo family headed by Ricardo Salgado. BES was to be split into a "good bank", renamed Novo Banco, and a "bad bank", which will house BES's exposures to the troubled Espirito Santo business empire as well as its Angolan subsidiary BESA. Novo Banco was recapitalised to the tune of 4.9 billion euros by a special bank Resolution Fund. The Portuguese state lends the fund 4.4 billion euros. The bank had a board for the 2014-2017 mandate presided by Vítor Bento.

A month and a half after he started up his duties, Vítor Bento abandoned the leadership of Novo Banco and was replaced in September 2014 by Eduardo Stock da Cunha.

The Resolution Fund is the bank's only shareholder until a sale transaction takes place. This fund is a structure created in 2012 with contributions from Portuguese banks and from the financial sector, and its operations are audited by the Portuguese regulator Banco de Portugal.

Novo Banco incorporates every staff, branch, deposits, credit customers and holders of senior bonds of Banco Espírito Santo.

In August 2014 Novo Banco launched its first communication campaign, to mark the beginning of the change in the image of the bank. From the campaign, whose symbol was a butterfly, the bank launched its new identity on September 22, which incorporated the animal's wings in the shape of a mathematical power, as a way to symbolize the commitment to “have once more the leading role it once had.” The change in the brand was made progressively, starting by the facades in the bank's branches.

On 30 June 2015, the resolution fund had received three binding bid offers on Novo Banco, from the Spanish banking group Banco Santander SA, the Chinese insurance group Fosun International Limited, the privately owned Chinese insurer Anbang Insurance, and the American private-equity firm Apollo Global Management. One of the bidders opted to improve their offer on 7 August 2015. The selection and sale to the final winner of the bidding process is expected to take place during Q3-2015. On 20 August, Banco de Portugal released a statement that the final phase of the sale process, was expected to conclude by 31 August. In September however the sale was cancelled owing to the offers being deemed unsatisfactory.

In March, 2016, it was announced that Portuguese state-rescued lender Novo Banco was planning to cut 1,000 jobs to help to reduce operating costs by 150 million euros ($163 million) as part of its restructuring plan agreed with the European Union. The proposed job cuts equated to 14 percent of the bank's workforce at the time.

In October 2016, the resolution fund had received four offers on Novo Banco from China's Minsheng Financial Holding, Apollo and Centerbridge and Lone Star. In January 2017, Aethel Partners headed by Ricardo Santos Silva made an offer to buy Novo Banco.

In March 2017, the Portuguese Central Bank announced that Lone Star Funds will acquire 75% of third largest Portuguese bank, Novo Banco, in return for a capital injection of €1bn. The other 25% will be retained by the Portuguese bank's resolution fund. In October 2017 the deal was closed and Lone Star Funds started controlling 75% of Novo Banco.

Retransfer
On 29 December 2015, Banco de Portugal unlawfully retransferred €2.2bn of bonds from Novo Banco back to the ‘bad bank’ BES. Of fifty two outstanding series of notes of equal seniority, the Bank of Portugal retransferred only five. This decision broke pari passu and imposed significant losses on investors in only those bonds. These five series of bonds were all governed by Portuguese Law. Save for one small series of notes, the other forty six were all governed by English law.

Legal Action
An ad-hoc bondholder group of over 20 financial institutions co-ordinated by Attestor Capital, BlackRock, CQS and PIMCO (the “Novo Note Group”), among other investors, is pursuing legal action against Banco de Portugal and is attempting to reach a resolution that would promote further investment  and the Novo Note Group's history of investing in Portugal.  The Novo Note Group has alleged that Banco de Portugal's retransfer decision broke pari passu (both between the holders of notes and between the notes and other senior creditors of equal ranking with the notes), the key legal principle of equal treatment of senior creditors, discriminated against international investors, and has damaged Portugal's credibility as an investment destination going forwards
In total, five series of Novo Banco bonds were retransferred back to BES out of a total series of  52. The Novo Note Group has taken the position that this select series of notes were chosen for retransfer rather than others because they were governed by Portuguese Law rather than English Law, which allowed Banco de Portugal to avoid litigation outside of Portugal. Despite the challenges this presents, the Novo Note Group has filed an appeal in the Administrative Court of Lisbon to challenge Banco de Portugal's actions in the proper forum.
In its appeal, the Novo Note Group has argued that Banco de Portugal's use of the retransfer powers was unlawful because it failed to exercise those powers for the original purpose they were designed for. Rather than use the retransfer powers to correct the perimeter of the ‘good bank’ and the ‘bad bank’, Banco de Portugal exercised the retransfer powers to fundamentally improve Novo Banco's financial condition. This is not what the retransfer powers were created for according to the Novo Note Group.
Moreover, the Novo Note Group has argued that Banco de Portugal was not permitted to use the retransfer powers it exercised in December 2015 because it failed to specify the assets that were subject to potential retransfer in the original resolution measure, as was required by the Bank Recovery and Resolution Directive (BRRD). In doing so, the Novo Note Group has argued that Banco de Portugal failed to comply with both EU law and the fundamental principles of Portuguese law.

References

Banks of Portugal
Banks established in 2014
Portuguese companies established in 2014